"Shameless" is a song recorded by Cuban-American singer Camila Cabello. It was released alongside "Liar" on September 5, 2019, as one of the double lead singles from her second studio album Romance (2019). Written by Cabello, Ali Tamposi, Andrew Watt, Jon Bellion, Jordan Johnson and Stefan Johnson, and produced by Watt and the Monsters and the Strangerz, the song is about Cabello finally facing her feelings about someone she loved. The music video was directed by Henry Scholfield in Los Angeles, California and was released on the same day as the single's release on YouTube. In the first half of 2023, “Shameless” received a viral resurgence in popularity via TikTok, with the audio most notably focusing on the bridge of the song. Sped-up versions of the song also emerged.

Background 
On September 1, 2019, Cabello posted a teaser of an upcoming project titled Romance. The first chapter is set to be released on September 5, 2019. In the following days, she went on to upload several pictures depicting the cover art for two songs titled "Shameless" and "Liar". She eventually revealed the official cover art of the song on September 4, 2019.

Composition 

"Shameless" is a power pop-punk, rock, and pop rock song with a dark edge. The song was written by Camila Cabello, Alexandra Tamposi, Andrew Wotman, Jonathan Bellion, Jordan Johnson and Stefan Johnson. The song runs for three minutes and thirty-nine seconds.

In terms of music notation, "Shameless" was composed using  common time in the key of E minor with a moderately fast tempo of 130 beats per minute. The song follows the chord progression of Em-D-C-G-Am. Cabello's vocal range spans from the low note E3 to the high note of E5, giving the song a two octave vocal range.

Music video 
The music video was directed by Henry Scholfield and filmed on August 12, 2019, in Los Angeles. It contains several scenes of the singer performing in various locations, such as singing in a Catholic confessional booth, dancing alongside a group of impersonators wearing red dresses, crawling inside a burning room, and running through a street while wearing a white dress. It draw comparisons to Rosalía's "Malamente", directed by Canada.

The video was released on September 5, 2019.

Track listings

Credits and personnel
Credits adapted from the liner notes of Romance.

Recording
 Recorded at Gold Tooth Music, Beverly Hills, California, and SARM Studios, London, England
 Mixed at MixStar Studios, Virginia Beach, Virginia
 Mastered at the Mastering Palace, New York City, New York

Personnel

 Camila Cabello – vocals, songwriting
 Andrew Watt – production, songwriting, guitar, keyboards, instrumentation, programming
 The Monsters and the Strangerz – production, keyboards, instrumentation, programming
 Jon Bellion – miscellaneous production, songwriting
 Alexandra Tamposi – songwriting
 Jordan Johnson – songwriting
 Stefan Johnson – songwriting
 Manny Marroquin – mixing
 Chris Galland – assistant mixing
 Paul Lamalfa – recording
 Nathaniel Alford – additional vocal engineering
 Dave Kutch – mastering

Charts

Certifications

Release history

References 

2019 singles
2019 songs
Camila Cabello songs
Songs written by Camila Cabello
Songs written by Ali Tamposi
Songs written by Andrew Watt (record producer)
Songs written by Jon Bellion
Songs written by Jordan Johnson (songwriter)
Songs written by Stefan Johnson
Song recordings produced by the Monsters & Strangerz
American pop rock songs
American pop punk songs
American rock songs
American power pop songs